Sector 1 is an administrative unit of Bucharest located in the northern part of the city. It contains also the northwestern districts of Băneasa and Pipera. Sector 1 is thought to be the wealthiest sector in Bucharest. Like each of Bucharest sectors, there is a Local Court (Judecătoria Sectorului 1), which it submits to the Bucharest Tribunal (Tribunalul București).

Economy
Blue Air, JeTran Air, Petrom, and Medallion Air have their head offices in Sector 1.

Quarters

Aviației
Băneasa
Bucureștii Noi
Dămăroaia

Dorobanți
Gara de Nord
Grivița
Floreasca

Pipera
Primăverii
Romană
Victoriei

Politics
The mayor of the sector is Clotilde Armand from the Save Romania Union (USR). She was elected in 2020 for a four-year term. The Local Council of Sector 1 has 27 seats, with the following party composition (as of 2020):

References

External links

 Sector 1 

Sectors of Bucharest